Whispering Pines may refer to:

Places in the United States
Whispering Pines, Arizona
Whispering Pines, California
Whispering Pines, Florida
Whispering Pines, North Carolina

Other uses
Whispering Pines: Live at the Getaway, an album by Richard Manuel
Whispering Pines/Clinton Indian Band, a member of the Secwepemc (Shuswap) Nation in British Columbia, Canada
"Whispering Pines," a late 1950s song by Johnny Horton
"Whispering Pines" (The Band song), a song by Richard Manuel and Robbie Robertson of The Band 
Whispering Pines, a video exhibition by Shana Moulton